The Ambassador of Malaysia to the Republic of Serbia is the head of Malaysia's diplomatic mission to Serbia. The position has the rank and status of an Ambassador Extraordinary and Plenipotentiary and is based in the Embassy of Malaysia, Belgrade.

List of heads of mission

Chargés d'Affaires to Serbia

Ambassadors to Serbia

See also
 Malaysia–Serbia relations

References 

 
Serbia
Malaysia